Trackdown may refer to:
 Trackdown (TV series), 1957 
 Trackdown (film), 1976
 Trackdown Digital, an Australian company

See also
 Track Down, a 2000 film